Sanjeev Tripathi is member of the BJP and former Secretary of the Research and Analysis Wing. Tripathi is the son-in-law of Former R&AW secretary, G.S. Bajpai, and comes from a  family of Bareilly, Uttar Pradesh. A keen sportsman, he topped the civil service  exam in 1972, and joined the Uttar Pradesh cadre. Few years later, he switched to RAW, resigning from the IPS, and was absorbed in the Research & Analysis Service (RAS), which feeds the ranks of RAW.  Mr. Tripathi is the first Secretary (R) to be from the RAS (RAW Allied Services) cadre in its more than four-decade history.

Biography

Tripathi played a significant role in tracking down Sikh separatists operating abroad and get them to India to participate in talks with the Indian government. He also served on several key desks, including the Pakistan desk, and also headed agency’s most sensitive special operations division, as special secretary. Earlier, he helped arrive at a peace accord with insurgents in the northeastern states. He also served as commissioner at R&AW’s Calcutta based Special Bureau, which looks at Bangladesh.

Mr. Tripathi, who has extensive experience in intelligence, has his task cut out. As the ARC chief he managed to ensure that the secretive Tibetan force, Special Frontier Force (SFF), gets pension and retirement benefits. The force has not had these benefits since its creation after the 1962 war with China.

Tripathi has been asked by the NSA, Shiv Shankar Menon, to prepare a comprehensive report on personnel policies by 15 January to ensure that the age-old turf wars between RAS and non-RAS cadre officers is laid to rest forever. R&AW has also been suffering from a shortage of recruits; morale is at an all-time low. So Tripathi will have to quickly focus on finding a solution to these squabbles and also focus on India’s restive neighborhood. Ten years ago, a Group of Ministers, aided by a special task force on intelligence, had gone about trying to reform India’s intelligence community, which seems mired in controversies and lacking in infrastructure, resources and parliamentary oversight. Now, it is up to the two new chiefs to take forward their inheritance and leave behind a productive legacy. 

He joined the Bhartiya Janata Party ahead of the Lok Sabha election in 2014.

References

Indian police officers
Spymasters
Indian spies
Living people
People of the Research and Analysis Wing
Year of birth missing (living people)
Bharatiya Janata Party politicians from Uttar Pradesh